Karai may refer to:

Toponym
Karai, Iran, 
Karai, Perak, Malaysia
Karai, Sultanpur, a village in Uttar Pradesh, India

Demonym
Qarai Turks (Karāʾi, Qarāʾi) or "Black Tatars"
Karai, caste subdivision among Mallar (caste), Urali Gounder caste, in India
Karai, landlord class among the Guarani people
Karai, extinct Turkic language written in Hebrew script of Crimean Karaites

Surname
József Karai, Hungarian composer
Senryū Karai (:ja:柄井川柳; 1718–1790), Japanese poet, originator of Senryū form

Cuisine
Karai, also spelled Karahi, Indian cooking pot
Karai, braised in Indian cuisine
Karai, spicy in Japanese cuisine

Fictional characters
Karai, a major supporting character in the Teenage Mutant Ninja Turtles franchise, in which she is the on-and-off love interest and rival of the katana-wielding Ninja Turtle leader Leonardo
Karai, name of Count Nikolai Rostov's dog in some translations of Tolstoy's War and Peace

See also

Karay (disambiguation)
Karli (name)
Karri (disambiguation)
Qarai (disambiguation)